CFRT may refer to:

 CFRT-FM, a radio station in Iqaluit, Nunavut, Canada
 Canadian Forces Radio and Television, a now-defunct radio and television service for the Canadian Armed Forces
 Cystic Fibrosis Research Trust
 Continuous Fiberglass Reinforced Thermoplastic